Scheyville   is a suburb of Sydney, Australia.

Military history
From 1965 to 1973, Scheyville was the site of Officer Training Unit, Scheyville (OTU Scheyville), established to provide training to meet the growing need for officers for the new conscripts called up for service under the national service scheme.

Parks
In 1997 large tracts of land in the area were dedicated as the Scheyville National Park.  The area is named after William Schey, MLA, the Member for Redfern and later Darlington between 1887 and 1898.

The park is listed on the New South Wales Heritage Register.

References

External links

 Fields of Memories – The Scheyville Training Farm and Migrant Accommodation Centre 1911–1964

Suburbs of Sydney
City of Hawkesbury